Galina Vasilievna Yermolayeva (born 4 February 1937) is a retired Soviet sprint cyclist who dominated the UCI Track Cycling World Championships of 1958–1973, winning 6 gold, 5 silver and 3 bronze medals. Between 1956 and 1973 she also won at least 10 national titles.

She was born in Novokhopyorsk, but after World War II her family moved to Moscow, where her father worked as a taxi driver. As a teenager she competed at the national level in cross-country skiing but then after a frostbite accident changed to cycling. Later for her cycling achievements she was given a car, a personal gift of Leonid Brezhnev.

She graduated in construction engineer and later married Anatoly Vasiliev, changing her last name to Vasilieva.

References

1937 births
Living people
People from Voronezh Oblast
Soviet female cyclists
Russian female cyclists
UCI Track Cycling World Champions (women)
Russian track cyclists
Sportspeople from Voronezh Oblast